St. Peter's Lick Run Historic District is a registered historic district in Cincinnati, Ohio, listed in the National Register of Historic Places on October 4, 1989.  It contains 3 contributing buildings.

Historic uses 
Single Dwelling
Religious Structure
Church School

Notes 

National Register of Historic Places in Hamilton County, Ohio
Historic districts in Hamilton County, Ohio
Historic districts on the National Register of Historic Places in Ohio